Bullhead Lake is a lake in Watonwan County, in the U.S. state of Minnesota.

Bullhead Lake was so named for its stock of bullhead catfish.

See also
List of lakes in Minnesota

References

Lakes of Minnesota
Lakes of Watonwan County, Minnesota